Günter Hirschmann (born 8 December 1935) is a former German football player who spent almost his entire senior career at 1. FC Magdeburg and its predecessors.

Biography
Hirschmann began his footballing career at Einheit Burg, but in 1955 moved to BSG Motor Mitte Magdeburg where he soon established himself as a regular and also received his nickname Mücke (German for midge). In 1957 his team joined SC Aufbau Magdeburg and in 1965 became 1. FC Magdeburg, the first stand-alone football club in East Germany. Until 1969 when he ended his playing career, Hirschmann appeared in 330 league matches for his club, scoring 113 goals. Of these 162 matches were in the DDR-Oberliga, East Germany's top flight, where he scored 47 goals. In addition, Hirschmann played in 25 FDGB-Pokal matches, scoring 11 goals, and in 5 matches on European level.

His greatest successes were the cup wins with SC Aufbau Magdeburg in 1964 and 1965 as well as the cup victory with 1. FC Magdeburg in 1969. In the 1965 final Hirschmann scored the deciding goal, converting a penalty in the 89th minute to make it 2-1 to Magdeburg.

On 16 April 1961 Hirschmann won a call-up to the national team when manager Heinz Krügel used him in a match against Hungary. The 0-2 defeat remained his only appearance for East Germany.

After his playing career Hirschmann became a youth coach with 1. FC Magdeburg and worked as a metal worker in Magdeburg's Schwermaschinenbaukombinat Ernst Thälmann, a heavy engineering company. Today, he lives as a pensioner in Magdeburg.

Honours
FDGB-Pokal: 3
Winner 1964, 1965, 1969

External links

References

1935 births
Living people
East German footballers
1. FC Magdeburg players
People from Burg bei Magdeburg
Association football midfielders
Footballers from Saxony-Anhalt
East Germany international footballers